Newton Centre is one of the thirteen villages within the city of Newton in Middlesex County, Massachusetts, United States. The main commercial center of Newton Centre is a triangular area surrounding the intersections of Beacon Street, Centre Street, and Langley Road.  It is the largest downtown area among all the villages of Newton, and serves as a large upscale shopping destination for the western suburbs of Boston. The Newton City Hall and War Memorial is located at 1000 Commonwealth Avenue,  and the Newton Free Library is located at 330 Homer Street in Newton Centre. The Newton Centre station of the MBTA Green Line "D" branch is located on Union Street.

The Crystal Lake and Pleasant Street Historic District is roughly bounded by the Sudbury Aqueduct, Pleasant Avenue, Lake Avenue, and Crystal Street and Webster Court. This area and its surrounding neighborhoods exemplify the distinct styles of the late 19th century and early 20th century.

Crystal Lake, a 33-acre natural lake, is a popular swimming spot for locals in the area.

Education

K-12 Education
The Wellan Montessori School is a private school located at 80 Crescent Street in Newton Centre.
Mason-Rice Elementary School is a public elementary school operated by Newton Public Schools located at 149 Pleasant Street.
The Newton Country Day School of the Sacred Heart is a private, all-girls Roman Catholic high school and middle school located on the Loren Towle Estate off Centre Street.
Mt. Alvernia High School is a private, all-girls high school located at 790 Centre Street.

Colleges and universities
The Boston College Law School campus, which includes undergraduate housing, is located on Centre Street at the Newton Centre-Newton Corner line.
Andover Newton Theological School, now the Andover Newton Seminary, is a private graduate institution associated with the Yale Divinity School located on Herrick Rd.
Hebrew College is also located on Herrick Road in Newton Centre.

Historic pictorial map

See also
Newton Centre station
List of Registered Historic Places in Newton, Massachusetts

References

External links

 Andover Newton Theological School website
 City of Newton website

Villages in Newton, Massachusetts
Villages in Massachusetts